Risto Mitrevski (born 5 October 1991) is a Macedonian professional footballer who plays as a centre-back for Indonesian club Dewa United.

Club career
Born in Skopje, he played for numerous clubs in the Macedonian First League between 2009 and 2013.  On 31 May 2014 he signed with Bosnian Premier League side Sarajevo.  During the winter break of the 2014–15 season he agreed to a loan to Serbian side Donji Srem.  He made his debut in the 2014–15 Serbian SuperLiga on 21 February 2015, in a game of the round 16 against Borac Čačak.

On 4 January 2018, he signed with Hapoel Haifa.

On 11 June 2019, Mitrevski signed a contract with Liga I side Sepsi OSK

After having left Alashkert in October 2020, Mitrevski returned to Alashkert on 2 February 2021.

Dewa United
On 2 June 2022, Mitrevski signed a contract for Indonesian Liga 1 club Dewa United. Mitrevski became the first foreign player to sign for the club.

International career
Mitrevski was member of the Macedonian U19 team.

Career statistics

Club

Honours
Hapoel Haifa
Israel State Cup: 2017–18
Israel Super Cup: 2018

References

External links
 Risto Mitrevski at FK Sarajevo official website

1991 births
Living people
Footballers from Skopje
Macedonian footballers
FK Rabotnički players
FK Pobeda players
FK Napredok players
FK Teteks players
FK Metalurg Skopje players
FK Sarajevo players
FK Donji Srem players
NK Istra 1961 players
Hapoel Haifa F.C. players
Enosis Neon Paralimni FC players
FC Alashkert players
Sabah F.C. (Malaysia) players
Dewa United F.C. players
Macedonian First Football League players
Serbian SuperLiga players
Croatian Football League players
Israeli Premier League players
Cypriot First Division players
Armenian Premier League players
Malaysia Super League players
Liga 1 (Indonesia) players
Macedonian expatriate footballers
Expatriate footballers in Bosnia and Herzegovina
Expatriate footballers in Serbia
Expatriate footballers in Croatia
Expatriate footballers in Israel
Expatriate footballers in Cyprus
Expatriate footballers in Armenia
Expatriate footballers in Malaysia
Expatriate footballers in Indonesia
Macedonian expatriate sportspeople in Bosnia and Herzegovina
Macedonian expatriate sportspeople in Serbia
Macedonian expatriate sportspeople in Croatia
Macedonian expatriate sportspeople in Israel
Macedonian expatriate sportspeople in Cyprus
Macedonian expatriate sportspeople in Armenia
Macedonian expatriate sportspeople in Malaysia
Macedonian expatriate sportspeople in Indonesia
North Macedonia youth international footballers
Association football central defenders